Cossebaude station is a railway station in the Cossebaude district in the capital city of Dresden, Saxony, Germany.

References

Cossebaude